Jack Cliff (born 23 May 1919) is a former  Australian rules footballer who played with St Kilda in the Victorian Football League (VFL).

Notes

External links 

Year of death missing
1919 births
Australian rules footballers from New South Wales
St Kilda Football Club players
West Broken Hill Football Club players